Joe Corso (born December 22, 1951) is an American wrestler. He competed in the men's freestyle 57 kg at the 1976 Summer Olympics.

References

1951 births
Living people
American male sport wrestlers
Olympic wrestlers of the United States
Wrestlers at the 1976 Summer Olympics
Sportspeople from Des Moines, Iowa
Pan American Games medalists in wrestling
Pan American Games gold medalists for the United States
Wrestlers at the 1979 Pan American Games